Gyula may refer to:

 Gyula (title), Hungarian title of the 9th–10th century
 Gyula (name), Hungarian male given name, derived from the title

 People

 Gyula II, the gyula who was baptized in Constantinople around 950
 Gyula III, the gyula who was defeated by King Stephen I around 1003

 Places

 Gyula, Hungary, town in Hungary
 Gyulaháza, village in Hungary
 Gyulakeszi, village in Hungary
 , Hungarian name of Alba Iulia, Romania